Fabio Onidi (born 9 March 1988 in Milan) is a professional racing driver from Italy.

Career

Karting
Prior to starting his racing career, Onidi raced in karting for a number of years, finishing sixth in the European Championship ICA Junior category and winning the Italian Championship ICA Junior title in 2003.

Formula BMW
Onidi began his single–seater career in 2004 in the Formula BMW ADAC series, as one of current Formula One driver Sebastian Vettel's team–mates at ADAC Berlin-Brandenburg e.V. He finished his debut season in eighth place with the highlight being a Pole position at Brno. He continued in the championship in 2005, switching to the Eifelland Racing team. He finished the season in 11th place despite missing three races during the year. Onidi also took part in the end–of–season Formula BMW World Final, held at the Bahrain International Circuit, but he retired from the event.

Formula Renault 2.0
At the end of 2005, Onidi joined Fortec Motorsport to contest the British Formula Renault 2.0 Winter Series. He scored 20 points in the four races to finish 17th in the standings. He continued with the team into the main championship in 2006, finishing the season as the best rookie driver in 11th place.

In 2007, Onidi joined the Motorsport Arena team to contest both the Eurocup Formula Renault 2.0 and Formula Renault 2.0 Northern European Cup. He took a best finish of eighth place to finish 20th in the Eurocup standings, whilst in the Northern European Cup, he took podium places at both Zandvoort and Nürburgring to finish ninth in the championship, despite missing the last six races of the season.

In November 2007, Onidi took part in the four race Italian Formula Renault 2.0 Winter Series with RP Motorsport, taking two podiums to finish third in the standings. He finished level on points with the Cram Competition entry of Daniel Zampieri, but lost out on countback.

Euroseries 3000/Auto GP
For 2008, Onidi moved up to the Euroseries 3000 championship with the GP Racing team. He won his debut race at Vallelunga and took a second victory at Valencia later in the season to finish runner–up in the championship behind Nicolas Prost. In the accompanying Italian Formula 3000 series, he also ended the year as runner–up, finishing a single point behind Durango's Colombian driver Omar Leal.

Onidi remained in the championship in 2009, moving to fellow Italian team Fisichella Motor Sport to partner Rodolfo González. He again took two victories during the season, at Portimão and Vallelunga, but despite leading the championship heading into the final round at Monza, he finished third in the standings, behind Marco Bonanomi and eventual champion Will Bratt.

Onidi continued in the series for a third season in 2010, when the championship was re–branded as Auto GP. He raced for Team Lazarus in a single–car team. After taking a podium at the first event in Brno, Onidi added a further three podium positions to finish the season in eighth place, level on points with Carlos Iaconelli, who took seventh place due to his three race wins. He remained with Lazarus for the 2011 and was joined by compatriot Fabrizio Crestani; the two proved evenly matched, finishing fifth and sixth in the championship with Onidi seven points ahead.

A1 Grand Prix
Onidi made his A1 Grand Prix debut in October 2008, racing for A1 Team Italy at the first round of the 2008–09 season at Zandvoort in the Netherlands. Despite treacherous weather conditions, he finished seventh in the sprint race, although he retired from the feature race after a collision with the A1 Team South Africa car of Adrian Zaugg.

GP2 Series
In the autumn of 2008, Onidi took part in GP2 Series testing at Paul Ricard, testing for BCN Competición, Piquet GP and Super Nova Racing, and a year later he tested for Coloni Motorsport at Jerez. He made his GP2 racing début in the non-championship 2011 season finale with the Super Nova team alongside Giacomo Ricci, and switched to the category full-time for the 2012 season with the Coloni team, where he was paired with Stefano Coletti. He finished 20th in the final championship standings.

Other series
In April 2010, he drove for Tech 1 Racing in the final GP3 Series pre–season test held at the Circuit de Catalunya, and in October 2010 he sampled a Formula Renault 3.5 Series car for the first time, testing for Fortec Motorsport and ISR Racing at Motorland Aragón.

Racing record

Career summary

† – Team standings.

‡ – The team were known as FMS International until the second round of the season.

Complete GP2 Series results
(key) (Races in bold indicate pole position) (Races in italics indicate fastest lap)

Complete GP2 Final results
(key) (Races in bold indicate pole position) (Races in italics indicate fastest lap)

FIA GT Series results

References

External links
  
 
 

1988 births
Living people
Racing drivers from Milan
Auto GP drivers
A1 Team Italy drivers
Formula Renault Eurocup drivers
Formula Renault 2.0 NEC drivers
British Formula Renault 2.0 drivers
Italian Formula Renault 2.0 drivers
Formula BMW ADAC drivers
GP2 Series drivers
International GT Open drivers
A1 Grand Prix drivers
Mücke Motorsport drivers
Eifelland Racing drivers
Scuderia Coloni drivers
Fortec Motorsport drivers
Motopark Academy drivers
RP Motorsport drivers
AF Corse drivers
Team Lazarus drivers
Super Nova Racing drivers
Morand Racing drivers
Piquet GP drivers
Bhaitech drivers
SG Formula drivers
ISR Racing drivers